WFC Donchanka, also known as Donchanka TsPOR for sponsorship reasons, is a Ukrainian women's football club from Donetsk. Founded in 1992 as Tekstilshchik Donetsk, it was renamed as Donetsk-Ros in 1994 before taking its current name in 1997. Donchanka was the leading Ukrainian team for much of the 1990s, winning five championships and four national cups between 1994 and 1999. In 1999, the club lost its sponsors and leading players, and the shift was made to young talented players. It was third in the 2012 championship, its best result since 2003.

Titles
 Ukrainian League
 Winners (5): 1994, 1995, 1996, 1998, 1999
 Runners-up (2): 2000, 2001
 Third place (5):, 1997, 2002, 2003, 2012, 2013
 Ukrainian Cup (4)
 Winners (4): 1994, 1996, 1998, 1999
 Runners-up (4): 1995, 1997, 1999, 2012

2012 squad
As of 20 December 2012, according to the club's website

References

 
Association football clubs established in 1992
Football clubs in Donetsk
Ukrainian Women's League clubs
1992 establishments in Ukraine
Women's football clubs in Ukraine